Anna Cristina "Rickie" Niceta Lloyd (born May 22, 1970) is an Italian-American event planner who served as the White House Social Secretary for U.S. President Donald Trump.  She was appointed by First Lady Melania Trump on February 8, 2017.  Prior to her role at the White House, Lloyd worked for Design Cuisine, a catering company.

She resigned on January 6, 2021, following the 2021 storming of the United States Capitol.

Education
Niceta Lloyd is a graduate of Hollins College.

Career
As an account executive for Design Cuisine, Lloyd supported the Joint Committee on Inaugural Ceremonies in providing catering services for five presidential inaugurations, as well as numerous state luncheons, summits, and conferences in coordination with the Office of the Chief of Protocol.  Most recently, she participated in the planning and execution of events for President Trump's inaugural celebrations.

Personal
Niceta Lloyd was married to Thomas Lloyd. The couple has two children. Thomas Lloyd is the son of Stacy Barcroft Lloyd Jr. and the grandson of Rachel Lambert Mellon. Mellon was perhaps best known for helping to redesign the White House Rose Garden with Jacqueline Kennedy in the early 1960s. The Lloyds divorced in 2021, and in 2022, the Maryland Court of Special Appeals upheld a post-nuptial provision awarding Niceta Lloyd $7 million if Thomas committed adultery.

References

Living people
Trump administration personnel
White House staff
Hollins University alumni
1970 births
Event planners
People from Milan